Leo Francis Osiewalski (September 25, 1921 – February 23, 1985),  also known as Leo Oswall, was an American professional basketball player. He played for the Oshkosh All-Stars in the National Basketball League during the 1943–44 season, and then for the Baltimore Bullets in the American Basketball League in 1945–46.

References

1921 births
1985 deaths
American men's basketball players
United States Navy personnel of World War II
Baltimore Bullets (1944–1954) players
Basketball players from Wisconsin
Forwards (basketball)
Military personnel from Wisconsin
Oshkosh All-Stars players
People from Shawano County, Wisconsin